Greatest Hits is a compilation album by British rock band Smokie, released in April 1977. It contains all eight of the band's singles up to that date. All but one of the tracks ("Back to Bradford") were written by Nicky Chinn and Mike Chapman.

The album was a commercial success throughout Europe. It reached No. 6 in the UK Albums Chart, spending five months there and ultimately gaining a Silver status in Britain. The record topped the charts in several European countries, including Germany, Austria, Sweden and Norway.

Track listing
All tracks written by Nicky Chinn and Mike Chapman, except "Back to Bradford" written by Chris Norman and Pete Spencer.

Personnel
Produced by Mike Chapman in association with Nicky Chinn for Chinnichap
Engineered by Pete Coleman
Sleeve design by Ray Kyte
Photography – Gered Mankowitz

Charts

Weekly charts

Year-end charts

Certifications and sales

References

1977 greatest hits albums
Rak Records albums
Smokie (band) albums
Albums produced by Mike Chapman